Henri Caroine (born 7 September 1981) is a Tahitian footballer currently playing for Horizon Patho. He is a member of Tahiti national football team.

International career
Caroine made his debut for the senior team during the 2012 OFC Nations Cup. He appeared in all matches but the first, all of them as a starter.

Honours

Domestic
Tahiti First Division:
 Winner (1): 2012

International
OFC Nations Cup:
 Winner (1): 2012

International career statistics

References

External links
http://www.zerozero.pt/jogador.php?id=266595&epoca_id=0&search=1

1981 births
Living people
French Polynesian footballers
AS Magenta players
French Polynesian expatriate footballers
Tahiti international footballers
2012 OFC Nations Cup players
2013 FIFA Confederations Cup players
2016 OFC Nations Cup players
Association football midfielders